Clermont Northeastern High School is a public high school in northeastern Clermont County near Batavia, Ohio and Owensville, Ohio.  It is the only high school in the Clermont Northeastern Schools district. The school mascot is the Rocket.

Notes and references

External links
 District Website

High schools in Clermont County, Ohio
Public high schools in Ohio